Fujinaka is a Japanese surname. Notable people with the surname include:

, Japanese handball player
, Japanese volleyball player

Japanese-language surnames